Wolfgang Sandhowe (born 14 December 1953) is a German professional football manager and former player who is the manager of NOFV-Oberliga Nord club TuS Makkabi Berlin. As a player, he spent three seasons in the 2. Bundesliga with KSV Baunatal, FSV Frankfurt, and Preußen Münster. After retiring from playing, Sandhowe began a managing career. Since then, he has worked mostly at the third and fourth level of the German football league system. Most recently, he managed 1. FC Magdeburg, where he was released in October 2011.

References

External links
 Interview with Sandhowe, including a summary of his career

1953 births
Living people
People from Coesfeld (district)
Sportspeople from Münster (region)
German footballers
Association football forwards
2. Bundesliga players
FSV Frankfurt players
SC Preußen Münster players
VfL Osnabrück players
German football managers
Rot Weiss Ahlen managers
Eintracht Braunschweig managers
FC Carl Zeiss Jena managers
1. FC Magdeburg managers
SV Babelsberg 03 managers
Hammer SpVg players
Footballers from North Rhine-Westphalia
20th-century German people
Oberliga (football) managers
3. Liga managers
Regionalliga managers